Jean-Claude Kremer (born 25 June 1963) is a Luxembourgian sports shooter. He competed at the 1988 Summer Olympics and the 1992 Summer Olympics.

References

1963 births
Living people
Luxembourgian male sport shooters
Olympic shooters of Luxembourg
Shooters at the 1988 Summer Olympics
Shooters at the 1992 Summer Olympics
Sportspeople from Luxembourg City